This list of fossils with consumulites contains fossil specimens discovered to contain the preserved remains of food that the deceased animal had ingested during life. Such consumulites are a type of bromalite, the broader term applied to fossilized material ingested by an animal including waste expelled from the body like feces (coprolites) and vomit (regurgitalites). Consumulites are divided into three categories food in the animal's mouth when it died (oralites), food in the animal's throat when it died (esophagolites), partially digested stomach contents (gastrolites, not to be confused with gastroliths), and food found in the animal's intestinal tract (cololites).

Amphibians

Arthropods

Cartilaginous fishes

Choristoderes

Coelacanths

Dinosaurs

Ichthyosaurs

Mammals

Mosasaurs

Plesiosaurs

Pterosaurs

Ray-finned fishes

Turtles

Footnotes

References

 

Consumulites